Philadelphia International Airport  is the primary airport serving Philadelphia, Pennsylvania. The airport served 19.6 million passengers annually in 2021, making it the 21st busiest airport in the United States.

Philadelphia International Airport is the largest airport serving the state of Pennsylvania. It is the fifth-largest hub for American Airlines and its primary hub for the Northeastern United States, as well as its primary European and transatlantic gateway. Additionally, the airport is a regional cargo hub for UPS Airlines and a focus city for the ultra low-cost airline Frontier Airlines.

The airport has service to cities in the United States, Canada, the Caribbean, Latin America, Europe, and the Middle East. As of summer 2019, there are flights from the airport to 140 destinations, 102 domestic and 38 international. Most of the airport property is in Philadelphia proper. The international terminal and the western end of the airfield are in Tinicum Township, Delaware County.

Philadelphia International Airport is an important component of the economies of Philadelphia, the Delaware Valley metropolitan region to which it belongs, and the Commonwealth of Pennsylvania. The Commonwealth's Aviation Bureau reported in its Pennsylvania Air Service Monitor that the total economic impact made by the state's airports in 2004 was $22 billion. In 2017, PHL commissioned a new economic impact report. The report found PHL alone accounted for $15.4 billion in activity with over 96,000 direct and indirect jobs with $5.4 billion in total earnings. In October 2022, PHL gained a direct connection to a Colonial Pipeline fuel supply.

History
Starting in 1925, the Pennsylvania National Guard used the present airport site (known as Hog Island) as a training airfield. The site was dedicated as the "Philadelphia Municipal Airport" by Charles Lindbergh in 1927, but it had no proper terminal building until 1940; airlines used Camden Central Airport in nearby Pennsauken Township, New Jersey. Once Philadelphia's terminal was completed (on the east side of the field) American, Eastern, TWA and United moved their operations here.

In 1947 and 1950 the airport had runways 4, 9, 12 and 17, all  or less.

On June 20, 1940, the airport's weather station became the official point for Philadelphia weather observations and records by the National Weather Service.

World War II use
During World War II the United States Army Air Forces used the airport as a First Air Force training airfield.

Beginning in 1940, Rising Sun School of Aeronautics of Coatesville performed primary flight training at the airport under contract to the Air Corps. After the Pearl Harbor Attack, the I Fighter Command Philadelphia Fighter Wing provided air defense of the Delaware Valley area from the airport. Throughout the war, various fighter and bomber groups were organized and trained at Philadelphia airport and assigned to the Philadelphia Fighter Wing before being sent to advanced training airfields or being deployed overseas. Known units assigned were the 33d, 58th, 355th and 358th Fighter Groups.

In June 1943 I Fighter Command transferred jurisdiction of the airport to the Air Technical Service Command (ATSC). ATSC established a sub-depot of the Middletown Air Depot at the airport. The 855th Army Air Forces Specialized Depot unit repaired and overhauled aircraft and returned them to active service, and the Army Air Forces Training Command established the Philco Training School on January 1, 1943, which trained personnel in radio repair and operations.

In 1945 the Air Force reduced its use of the airport and it was returned to civil control that September.

Airline use
Philadelphia Municipal became Philadelphia International in 1945, when American Overseas Airlines began direct flights to Europe. (For a short time AOA's flights skipped the New York stop; that was probably Philadelphia's only international nonstop until Pan Am tried nonstops to Europe in 1961.) A new terminal opened in December 1953; the oldest parts of the present terminal complex (B and C) were built in the late 1950s.

The April 1957 OAG shows 30 weekday departures on Eastern, 24 TWA, 24 United, 18 American, 16 National, 14 Capital, 6 Allegheny and 3 Delta. To Europe, five Pan Am DC-6Bs a week via Idlewild and Boston and two TWA 749As a week via Idlewild; one TWA flight continued to Ceylon. Eastern and National had nonstops to Miami, but the TWA 1049G to LAX that started in 1956 was the only nonstop beyond Chicago. The first scheduled jets were TWA 707s in summer 1959.

Terminal B/C modernization was completed in 1970, Terminal D opened in 1973 and Terminal E in 1977; the $300 million expansion was designed by Arnold Thompson Associates, Inc. and Vincent G. Kling & Associates.

In the 1980s PHL hosted several hubs. The Airline Deregulation Act of 1978 allowed regional carrier Altair Airlines to create a small hub at PHL using Fokker F-28s. Altair began in 1967 with flights to cities such as Rochester, New York, Hartford, Connecticut and to Florida until it ceased operations in November 1982. In the mid-1980s Eastern Air Lines opened a hub in Concourse C. The airline declined in the late 1980s and sold aircraft and gate leases to Chicago-based Midway Airlines. Midway operated its Philadelphia hub until it ceased operation in 1991. During the 1980s US Airways (then called USAir) built a hub at PHL.

US Airways became the dominant carrier at PHL in the 1980s and 1990s and shifted most of its hub operations from Pittsburgh to Philadelphia in 2003. As of 2013, PHL was US Airways' largest international hub and its second-largest hub overall behind Charlotte. PHL became an American Airlines hub after it completed its merger with US Airways in 2015 and remains one of the airline's biggest hubs, offering an average of 420 departing flights per day to over 100 destinations. In recent years, American has opted to continue expanding at PHL while downsizing its hub at JFK in New York due to greater slot availability, lower operation costs in Philadelphia, and its greater network of connecting flights.

In July 1999 the Pennsylvania Department of Transportation (PennDOT) and several U.S. federal government agencies selected a route for the connecting ramps from Interstate 95 to the Terminal A-West complex, then under development; the agency tried to avoid the John Heinz National Wildlife Refuge at Tinicum. K/B Fund II, the owner of the International Plaza complex, formerly the Scott Paper headquarters Scott Plaza, objected to the proposed routing, saying it would interfere with International Plaza development. It entered a filing in the U.S. Court of Appeals for the Third Circuit to challenge the proposed routing. In 2000, the airport attempted to acquire the complex for $90 million but Tinicum Township commissioners stopped the deal from going forward, citing concerns of a loss of tax revenue for the township and the Interboro School District, which serves Tinicum, as well as noise pollution concerns.

In 2002 construction on the controversial new entrance ramps went forward. The new ramps eliminated the traffic signal and stop intersections previously encountered by northbound I-95 motorists who had to use Route 291 to the airport. The project consisted of six new bridges, more than 4,300 linear feet of retaining walls, and 7.7 lane miles of new pavement. The project also included new highway lighting, overhead sign structures, landscaping and the paving of Bartram Avenue. Also under the project, PennDOT resurfaced I-95 between Route 420 and Island Avenue and built a truck enforcement and park-and-ride facility. In 2003 Terminal A-West opened, with a 1,500-space parking garage. Construction of the terminal was funded by airport revenue bonds sold by the Philadelphia Authority for Industrial Development.

By 2005 two studies dealt with expanding runway capacity at PHL: the Runway 17–35 Extension Project EIS and the PHL Capacity Enhancement Program EIS. Other changes made with the Runway 17–35 Extension Project included additional taxiways and aprons, relocation of perimeter service roads, and modifications to nearby public roads.

The status of Philadelphia as an international gateway and major hub for American Airlines and the growth of Southwest Airlines and other low-cost carriers have increased passenger traffic to record levels in the mid-2000s; in 2004 28,507,420 passengers flew through Philadelphia, up 15.5% over 2003. In 2005, 31,502,855 passengers flew through PHL, marking a 10% increase since 2004. In 2006, 31,768,272 passengers travelled through PHL, a 0.9% increase.

US Airways commenced a nonstop link between Philadelphia and the Middle East in July 2009, operating an Airbus A330 service to Tel Aviv. Following the merger with American Airlines, the latter carrier continued to fly the route. However, the flight never performed well financially, leading American Airlines to end it in early 2016.

At  in length, runway 9R/27L (previously 10,506 feet) is the longest civil runway in Pennsylvania.

In 2011, a nearly 85,000-square-foot mural was completed along the sides of the airport parking garages that face I-95. The design includes images taken from photographs of Philadelphians dancing by local photographer JJ Tiziou. More than 800 people painted the mural over four months.

Facilities

Terminals
Philadelphia International Airport has six terminals with a total of 126 gates. Non pre-cleared international arrivals are processed in Terminal A. American operates Admirals Clubs in Terminal A, the B/C connector and Terminal F. Terminal A also contains a British Airways Galleries Lounge as well as a American Express Centurion Lounge. Terminal D contains a United Club as well as a Delta Sky Club. A USO lounge is located in Terminal E.

Terminal A

Terminal A is divided into two sections, east and west. Terminal A West has 13 gates, while Terminal A East has 11 gates. Terminal A West has a modern and innovative design, made by Kohn Pedersen Fox, Pierce Goodwin Alexander & Linville and Kelly/Maiello. Opened in 2003 as the new international terminal, it is now home to American (domestic and international), British Airways, Lufthansa, and Qatar Airways. It offers a variety of international dining options. International Arrivals (except from locations with Customs preclearance) arrive at gates in both Terminal A east and west and are processed at the Terminal A West arrival building.

Terminal A East, originally the airport's international terminal, is now used by Aer Lingus and American domestic and international flights as well as international arrivals for Frontier Airlines and Spirit Airlines. A-East is well maintained and received an upgrade to its baggage claim facilities. Most of the gates in this terminal are equipped to handle international arrivals and the passengers are led to the customs facility in Terminal A West. It opened in 1990. The security entrance was significantly enlarged in 2012.

There are three lounges along the corridor between Terminal A East and A West; an American Airlines Admirals Club, British Airways Galleries Lounge and American Express Centurion Lounge. The east terminal also contains an Admirals Club. There is also a children's play area located in the east terminal.

Terminals B and C
Terminals B and C have 15 and 14 gates respectively. They are the two main terminals used by American. They were renovated at a cost of $135 million in 1998, which was designed by DPK&A Architects, LLP. They are connected by a shopping mall and food court named the Philadelphia Marketplace. Remodeling was done in the gate areas, although these cosmetic changes will not solve the space problems at many of the gates. Overall, the facilities are fairly modern and dining options on the concourses are also available. They are the oldest terminals and opened in 1953. There is an American Airlines Admirals Club located in the B/C connector.

Gate assignments for Terminals B & C are:
American / American Eagle - Gates B1-B16 & Gates C17-C31.

Terminal D
Terminal D has 16 gates; it opened in 1973. The terminal was upgraded in late 2008 with a new concourse connecting to Terminal E while providing combined security, a variety of shops and restaurants and a link between Baggage Claims D and E. This is the inverse of the connector between Terminals B and C, which comprises a combined ticket hall but separate security facilities. Terminal D is home to Air Canada, Delta, Spirit (check-in only with gates in Terminal E) and United. This terminal is connected to the shopping area of Terminals B/C through a post-security walkway. The terminal contains a United Club and a Delta Sky Club.

Gate assignments for Terminal D are:
Air Canada - Gate D5
Alaska - Gate D6
Delta - Gates D8, D10, D12, D14, D15, & D16
JetBlue - Gate D4
Sun Country - Gate D6
United - Gates D3, D7, D9, D11, & D13
Gates D1 & D2 are used for overflow and are common use gates.

Terminal E
Terminal E has 17 gates. It is home to Alaska Airlines (check-in only, departures from D6), Frontier, JetBlue (check-in only as of 2022), and Southwest. It opened in 1977. Terminal E houses a USO lounge available for all members of the military and their family.

Terminal F
Terminal F has 38 gates. The terminal is a regional terminal used by American Eagle and Contour Airlines flights. It includes special jet bridges that allow passengers to board regional jets without walking on the apron. Opened in 2001, Terminal F is the second newest terminal building at PHL. It was designed by Odell Associates, Inc. and The Sheward Partnership. An American Airlines Admirals Club is located above the central food court area of Terminal F.

When Terminal F opened in 2001, it had  of space for concessions.

Overseas Terminal (Old international terminal) ￼ 
The Overseas Terminal housed all the international airlines at Philadelphia. It was opened in 1973 and the building was a converted hangar. It was replaced by Terminal A in 1991.

Ground transportation

SEPTA Regional Rail's Airport Line serves stations at Terminals A, B, C, D, and E. The four stations are Airport Terminal A East/West, Airport Terminal B, Airport Terminals C & D, and Airport Terminals E & F. The stations are next to the baggage claim at each terminal with escalator and elevator access from each terminal's skywalk. The Airport Line connects to Center City Philadelphia, other SEPTA trains, Amtrak trains, and NJ Transit trains at 30th Street Station. The Airport Line runs through Center City Philadelphia to Glenside, Pennsylvania; half of the trains continue to Warminster, Pennsylvania, on the Warminster Line while the other half of weekday trains diverge past Wayne Junction to continue to Fox Chase, Philadelphia, Pennsylvania, on the Fox Chase Line and the other half of weekend/holiday trains terminate at Glenside. The Airport Line runs 5:00 a.m. to midnight daily, with trains every 30 minutes on weekdays and every hour or weekends and holidays. The ride from the airport to Center City Philadelphia takes 25 minutes.

Philadelphia International Airport has road access from an interchange with I-95 (exit 12 northbound and exit 12A southbound), which heads north toward Center City Philadelphia and south into Delaware County. PA 291 heads northeast from the airport area and provides access to and from I-76 (Schuylkill Expressway). Rental cars are available through a number of companies; each operates a shuttle bus between its facility and the terminals. As part of the airport's expansion plan, the airport plans to construct a consolidated rental car facility. Taxis and ride-sharing services both serve the airport.

SEPTA has various bus routes to the airport: Route 37 (serving South Philadelphia and Chester Transportation Center), Route 108 (serving 69th Street Transportation Center and the UPS air hub), and Route 115 (serving Delaware County Community College and Darby Transportation Center). Local colleges and universities including The University of Pennsylvania, Villanova University, Swarthmore College, Haverford College and Saint Joseph's University traditionally operate transportation shuttles to the airport for students during heavy travel periods such as spring and Thanksgiving breaks.

Airlines and destinations
The following airlines provide daily or weekly flights to the following destinations:

Passenger

Cargo

Statistics

Top destinations

Top airlines

Annual traffic

Accidents and incidents

 On January 14, 1951, National Airlines Flight 83 crashed upon landing at Philadelphia from Newark. The aircraft skidded off the runway, crashed through a fence and came to rest in a ditch. During the incident, the left wing broke off, rupturing the gas tanks and setting the plane on fire. There were seven fatalities in all. Frankie Housley, the lone stewardess on Flight 83, led ten passengers to safety but died trying to save an infant.
 On July 19, 1970, United Airlines Flight 611, a Boeing 737-222 on a domestic flight to Rochester, New York, experienced an engine failure in the #1 engine right after rotation. The captain decided to reject the takeoff and set the plane back on the runway. The plane touched down 1075 feet short of the runway end, continued across a blast pad, crossing a field, then passing through a 6-foot aluminum chain link fence into a field full of grass, brush and weeds. The 737 came to rest 1634 feet past the end of the runway. There were no fatalities and 18 passengers and one crew member sustained injuries among the 61 on board. The aircraft was damaged beyond economical repair. This was the first hull loss of a Boeing 737.
 On June 23, 1976, Allegheny Airlines Flight 121, a McDonnell Douglas DC-9, crash landed at PHL on final approach when encountering wind shear during a thunderstorm. There were 86 injuries out of the 4 crew and 102 passengers on board, but no fatalities. The aircraft was substantially damaged when it slid down the runway after touchdown, and was written off. 
 On February 7, 2006, a UPS Airlines Douglas DC-8 cargo plane suffered an in-flight cargo fire and made an emergency landing at Philadelphia International Airport after filling with smoke. There were no injuries other than smoke inhalation affecting the crew, but the plane burned on the ground for hours into the night, though most of the cargo survived, the aircraft was a total loss, with multiple holes burned through the roof skin. According to the NTSB, the firefighting crew did not have adequate training on using their skin-piercing extinguishing equipment and not knowing how to open the main cargo door, attempted to force the handle and broke the latch, rendering the door unopenable. There were also difficulties in obtaining the cargo manifest to determine what if any hazardous materials were on board, due to confusion about protocol. However, despite these failings, the airport staff, including the firefighting staff, managed the incident successfully without injury or major disruption of the airport. The NTSB suspected lithium ion batteries were the source of ignition and made recommendations for more stringent rules and restrictions on their air transport, especially on passenger aircraft (unlike this one). For a cause of the incident, the NTSB focused on the delayed indication of fire by the required onboard fire detection system and criticized the standards to which such systems are tested, noting that the tests use an empty cargo hold and do not represent the real-world performance of the detection systems with the hold full of cargo, which significantly changes the flow patterns of hot air and smoke. The crew and air traffic control personnel were found to have behaved properly (with minor exceptions) and not to be at fault for the incident or its outcome. 
On March 13, 2014, US Airways Flight 1702, an Airbus A320-214, rotated then aborted takeoff and as a result suffered a tailstrike and a nose landing gear collapse. The aircraft then continued down runway 27L coming to a stop off to the left of the runway. None of the 149 passengers and 5 crew members suffered life-threatening injuries. However, the aircraft saw substantial damage and was later written off. The aircraft was stored at the airport until 2021 when it was finally removed from the airport for scrapping.
 On April 17, 2018, Southwest Airlines Flight 1380, a Boeing 737-700 en route from New York to Dallas, suffered an engine failure on its left engine. Debris from the engine struck the aircraft's fuselage and a side window. The window failed, causing a rapid depressurization of the aircraft, which made an emergency descent and diverted to land at Philadelphia International Airport. One passenger died after being partially ejected from the failed window. Seven others were injured and treated locally at the airport.

See also

 Hog Island
 Northeast Philadelphia Airport
 Philadelphia TRACON
 Pennsylvania World War II Army Airfields

References

External links

 Philadelphia International Airport (official web site)
 
 Wings Over Philadelphia – Abundant Information Regarding PHL
 Pennsylvania Bureau of Aviation: Philadelphia International Airport
 Food and Shops at PHL
 PHL-Citizens Aviation Watch
 
 

 
1925 establishments in Pennsylvania
Airfields of the United States Army Air Forces in Pennsylvania
Airports established in 1925
Airports in Pennsylvania
Transportation in Philadelphia
Southwest Philadelphia
Transportation in Delaware County, Pennsylvania
Government departments of Philadelphia